Samuel Hamilton Buskirk (born New Albany, Indiana, January 19, 1820; died Indianapolis, Indiana, April 3, 1879) was a lawyer, politician, and justice of the Indiana Supreme Court.

Buskirk graduated from Indiana University Bloomington in 1841. After serving as Monroe County recorder (1844-5), he began practicing law in 1845. He was the Monroe County prosecuting attorney in 1851. Buskirk served five terms in the Indiana House of Representatives and was Speaker of the House in the 1863 session. He was appointed a director of the Indiana State Prison in 1859. He was elected to the Supreme Court of Indiana in 1870 for a term lasting from January 3, 1871, to January 1, 1877, and was also appointed by governor Conrad Baker to a vacancy in the court in November 1870. During his time on the Supreme Court he wrote Buskirk's Practice (1876), a manual of Supreme Court practice.

Buskirk wrote the opinion in the 1874 case Cory v. Carter, which upheld the principle of separate but equal in Indiana schools. It was one of the precedents cited in the United States Supreme Court's 1896 Plessy v. Ferguson decision.

Samuel Buskirk's younger brother George Abraham Buskirk (1829–1874) was also a lawyer; his brother helped him study law. He served as a district judge and as a state representative in Indiana, and was also elected Speaker of the House, in 1869. Another younger brother, Edward C. Buskirk (1833-1900), was also a lawyer and a Marion County criminal judge. Edward was also the (unsuccessful) Democratic candidate for mayor in Indianapolis in 1879.

References

1820 births
1879 deaths
Justices of the Indiana Supreme Court
Members of the Indiana House of Representatives
Indiana University Bloomington alumni
People from New Albany, Indiana
Speakers of the Indiana House of Representatives
19th-century American politicians
19th-century American judges